James Banks Stanhope (13 May 1821 – 18 January 1904) was a British Conservative Party politician.

Family
Stanhope was the son of former MP and British Army officer James Hamilton Stanhope and Lady Frederica-Louisa Murray, daughter of David William Murray, 3rd Earl of Mansfield.

Revesby Abbey

Stanhope inherited Revesby Abbey in 1823 from his father but did not succeed to the estate until 1842, however, as he was a minor. By the time he succeeded to the estate, it had fallen into disrepair and had been emptied.

In 1843, he commissioned Scottish architect William Burn to redesign the new abbey in a mixture of Jacobean and Elizabethan, also known as Jacobethan. The building was demolished in 1844, with its materials sold at auction, to make way for the abbey's third incarnation.

During this period, new screen gates and a lodge were added on the south boundary. The estate was then completed in 1846 and, following financial losses from the Great Depression of British Agriculture, the estate was passed to Stanhope's elected heir, Edward Stanhope.

Political career
He was elected MP for North Lincolnshire in 1852 and held the seat until he stood down in 1868.

References

External links
 

Conservative Party (UK) MPs for English constituencies
UK MPs 1859–1865
1821 births
1904 deaths
James